Miss Philippines Earth 2016 was the 16th edition of the Miss Philippines Earth pageant. It was held on June 11, 2016 at the University of the Philippines Theater in Quezon City, Philippines. Angelia Gabrena Ong of Manila crowned Imelda Schweighart of Puerto Princesa City at the end of the event. Schweighart represented the Philippines at the Miss Earth 2016 pageant but failed to make it to the semifinals.

The coronation night was supposed to be held at the Aguinaldo Shrine in Kawit, Cavite but due to severe weather conditions, this was later moved to the UP Theater in Quezon City.

Due to the controversies prior to and after Miss Earth 2016, Imelda resigned from her duties as Miss Philippines Earth. Miss Philippines Earth-Water 2016 Loren Mar Artajos assumed the responsibilities Imelda has left. It was supposed to be handed over to Kiera Giel Gregorio but declined due to her law school commitments in London, therefore relinquishes her crown as well. Henceforth, those who are under Artajos move 2 steps higher and two semi-finalists are now part of the elemental court.

This is the first edition where the reigning Miss Philippines Earth and Miss Philippines Earth-Air resigned.

Results
Color keys

Eventual Results
Due to several resignations the final titles are as follows:

Special Awards

Challenge Events

Miss Friendship
The winners are:

Miss Photogenic (Miss Ever Bilena)
The winners are:

Talent Competition
The winners are:

Cultural Costume Competition
The winners are:

Swimsuit Competition
The winners are:

Trash to Class Competition
The winners are:

Cocktail Wear Competition
The winners are:

Resort Wear Competition
The winners are:

Evening Gown Competition
The winners are:

Darling of the Press
The winners are:

Delegates
The following is the list of the 46 official delegates of Miss Philippines Earth 2016 representing various cities, municipalities, provinces, and Filipino communities abroad, namely: the National Capital Region, Northern Luzon, Central Luzon, Southern Tagalog, Bicol, Minparom, Metro Manila, Eastern Visayas, Central Visayas, Western Visayas, Northern Mindanao, Southern Mindanao, and Zamboanga with the addition of 2 International representatives. Minparom will gradually move towards the Visayan region due to its geographical location which is closer to Visayas than the Luzon mainland.

Judges

References

External links
Miss Philippines Earth official website

2016
2016 beauty pageants
2016 in the Philippines